The Roman Catholic Diocese of Salford is centred on the City of Salford in Greater Manchester, England.

The diocese was founded in 1852 as one of the first post-Reformation Catholic dioceses in Great Britain. Since 1911 it has formed part of the Province of Liverpool. Its current boundaries encompass Manchester and a large part of North West England, between the River Mersey and the River Ribble, as well as some parishes north of the Ribble and Todmorden in Calderdale, West Yorkshire. Stonyhurst College is also within the diocese. In 2005, the diocese included 207 churches and chapels.

History

The first post-Reformation Catholic chapel in Blackburn was opened in 1773, and that in Manchester in 1774 (in Rook Street, dedicated to St Chad). In 1843 the Rev. James Sharples, rector of St. Alban's, Blackburn, was consecrated Titular Bishop of Samaria and appointed coadjutor to Bishop Brown, the first Vicar Apostolic of the Lancashire District. He built at Salford St. John's Church, which was opened in 1848 and which subsequently became the cathedral for the diocese.

Dr. Sharples died on 16 August 1850 and the first Bishop of Salford in the restored hierarchy was the Most. Rev. William Turner (1790–1872). He was succeeded in 1872 by the Most. Rev. Herbert Vaughan (1832–1903). On his translation to Westminster in 1892, the Most. Rev. John Bilsborrow (1836–1903) was consecrated as the third bishop. The Most. Rev. Louis Charles Casartelli, DD, MA, Litt.D., the fourth bishop, was born in 1852, and ordained priest in 1876. He was closely associated with Cardinal Vaughan in the foundation of St. Bede's College, Manchester, in 1876, and was rector of it when he was nominated bishop in 1903. Bishop Casartelli was also a professor at the Catholic University of Leuven, and known as a writer on Oriental subjects.

Bishops of Salford

Diocesan Bishops of Salford
 William Turner (appointed on 27 June 1851 – died on 13 July 1872) 
 Herbert Vaughan (appointed on 27 September 1872 – translated to Westminster on 8 April 1892) (Cardinal in 1893)
 John Bilsborrow (appointed on 15 July 1892 – died on 5 March 1903) 
 Louis Charles Casartelli (appointed on 28 August 1903 – died on 18 January 1925) 
 Thomas Henshaw (appointed on 14 December 1925 – died on 23 September 1938) 
 Henry Vincent Marshall (appointed on 5 August 1939 – died on 14 April 1955) 
 George Andrew Beck (appointed on 28 November 1955 – translated to Liverpool on 29 January 1964)
 Thomas Holland (appointed on 28 August 1964 – retired on 22 June 1983) 
 Patrick Altham Kelly (appointed on 9 March 1984 – translated to Liverpool on 21 May 1996) 
 Terence Brain (appointed on 2 September 1997 – retired on 2 October 2014)
 John Arnold (appointed on 30 September 2014)

 Auxiliary Bishops of Salford
 John Stephen Vaughan (appointed on 13 July 1909 – died on 4 December 1925).
 Geoffrey Burke (appointed on 26 May 1967 – retired on 12 September 1988).

 Other priests of this diocese who became bishops
James Cunningham, appointed auxiliary bishop of Hexham and Newcastle in 1957
George Patrick Dwyer, appointed Bishop of Leeds in 1957
John Francis McNulty, appointed Bishop of Nottingham in 1932
Thomas Leo Parker, appointed Bishop of Northampton in 1940

Cathedral

St John's Cathedral, Salford

Diocesan parishes

References

Further reading
Almanac for the Diocese of Salford; for the year 1877 etc. Various publishers;  (annual: cover title: Salford Diocesan Almanac) 
(includes a directory detailing the histories of all the churches and chapels which have either closed or changed their names)

External links 
 
Diocese of Salford, Catholic Hierarchy website
GCatholic.org
The Latin Mass Society
Statistics for all parishes in the diocese

 
Religious organisations based in England
Religious organizations established in 1850
Organisations based in Salford
Salford
1850 establishments in England
Roman Catholic Ecclesiastical Province of Liverpool